Gastrocopta chichijimana was a species of very small air-breathing land snail, a terrestrial pulmonate gastropod mollusks in the family Vertiginidae, the whorl snails.

This snail was endemic to Japan; it is now extinct.

References

Vertiginidae
Extinct gastropods
Extinct animals of Japan
Taxonomy articles created by Polbot